Justice Stowers may refer to:

Craig Stowers, chief justice of the Alaska Supreme Court
Harry Stowers, chief justice of the New Mexico Supreme Court